Filomena is a female given name.  

It can also refer to:
 The Decameron
 Santa Filomena (disambiguation), various meanings
 Santa Filomena, a poem by Henry Wadsworth Longfellow which alluded to Florence Nightingale and coined the term "lady with the lamp"
 Storm Filomena in 2021